Leon Mackey (born February 28, 1989) is an American football defensive end who is currently a free agent. He played college football for the Texas Tech. He signed his first NFL contract with the Vikings after spending the 2014 season with the Arizona Rattlers of the Arena Football League (AFL).

Early years
Born in Florida, Mackey moved to Wilmington, Delaware where he was a standout defensive end at Christiana High School. He spent the 2008 campaign at Hargrave Military Academy, where he was considered a four-star prospect by Scout.com. He selected South Carolina after originally committing to Clemson and turning down offers from Arkansas and North Carolina, among others. He originally signed with Virginia Tech, but failed to qualify academically.

College career
Mackey began his collegiate career at Hinds Community College in Raymond, Mississippi before transferring to Texas Tech in 2011, where he played for two years. At Hinds, Mackey in nine games for Head Coach Gene Murphy, recording 47 tackles (36 solo), 15.5 tackles for a loss of 53 yards, 4.5 sacks for a loss of 19 yards and forcing one fumble. He received first-team All-conference honors.

In his final season at Texas Tech in 2012, Mackey earned All-Big 12 honorable mention.

Professional career

Arizona Rattlers
Mackey spent the 2014 season with the Arizona Rattlers of the Arena Football League (AFL). Mackey recorded a half sack in two regular season games with the Rattlers in 2014 before recording three sacks in the playoffs, helping the Rattlers win the ArenaBowl XXVII Championship Title.

Minnesota Vikings
On January 5, 2015, Mackey was signed by the Minnesota Vikings of the National Football League (NFL) in recognition of his "athleticism," "explosive" ability, "effort," and "determination" demonstrated in both his 2014 stints with the Indoor Football and later Arena Football Leagues, and in his 2015 Vikings tryout. "

Chicago Eagles
In April 2016, Mackey signed with the Chicago Eagles.

Baltimore Brigade
Mackey was assigned to the Baltimore Brigade on January 19, 2017. He was placed on recallable reassignment on March 31, 2017. On July 8, the Rattlers defeated the Sioux Falls Storm in the United Bowl by a score of 50–41.

Jacksonville Sharks
On October 5, 2017, Mackey signed with the Jacksonville Sharks.

References

External links
 Texas Tech Red Raiders bio 
 Minnesota Vikings bio

1989 births
Living people
American football defensive ends
Hinds Eagles football players
Texas Tech Red Raiders football players
Minnesota Vikings players
People from Wilmington, Delaware
Players of American football from Delaware
Green Bay Blizzard players
Arizona Rattlers players
Chicago Eagles players
Baltimore Brigade players
Jacksonville Sharks players
Washington Valor players